Phanuel ( Phanouēl) or Penuel ( Pənū’êl) was the father of Anna the prophetess. He was a member of the Tribe of Asher and his name means "Face of God".

Theologian John Gill supposed that "this man might be a person of some note, or he may be mentioned for the sake of his name, which signifies the face of God, and is the name Jacob gave to a certain place where he had seen God face to face". As Anna was herself 'very old', it can be assumed that Phanuel was not still alive at the time of Anna's encounter with the child Jesus in the Temple.

References

People in the canonical gospels
Gospel of Luke